Anna Oi Chan Lao  (born 7 May 1962) is a former Australian badminton player. She is the most successful badminton player in the history of Australian badminton.

She was ranked 5th in the 1992 Summer Olympics in Barcelona, where badminton had only been introduced for the first time as an Olympic sport. Lao played in the quarterfinals for women's singles and women's doubles where most participants only make it through one discipline.

In the 2021 Queen's Birthday Honours, Lao was appointed as a Member of the Order of Australia for her significant service to badminton, sports & to the multicultural community.

Career 
Lao was ranked 2nd in China before she left to represent Australia in the Olympics, in which she was ranked 1st in Australia. She held the times of Master of Sports in China in 1985. Prior to her participation in the Olympics, she held the titles of the Australian Open in 1988, 1989 and 1991 in women's singles, doubles and mixed doubles.

Lao also reached the semifinals of the 1989 Malaysia Open. She was also a champion at the 1991 New Zealand Open and the 1992 French Open. She was a semifinalist at the 1992 Swedish Open.

1992 Barcelona Olympics 
Badminton was first introduced to the Olympic Games in the 1992 Barcelona Olympics. She placed 5th in women's singles & women's doubles.

Women's doubles 
Lao played with her doubles partner Rhonda Cator. Their first game with Swiss players Silvia Albrecht & Bettina Villars were a success scoring 15–3, 15–6. Their second round was with Polish players Bożena Bąk & Wioletta Wilk Sosnowska where they won 15–3, 15–12. Lao and Cator entered the quarterfinals with the world champions Lin Yanfen & Yao Fen where they lost 13–18, 5–15.

Women's singles 
Lao played a total of 4 games and entered the quarterfinals. Her first game was with Bettina Villars, whom she played against previously in doubles and won easily in two games. Her second round was with Camilla Martin, a player from Denmark who later on received the European Championship three times. Lao won 11–6, 12–11. She later played with the European champion at the time, Elena Rybkina. Lao won in three games. After winning the third round of games, she was placed in the quarterfinals where she versed world champion Tang Jiuhong, and lost both games.

Awards and recognition 

 Courvoisier Award for Excellence Sports (1993)
 World Morning Cup 50-54 age Mix-Doubles Champion, Double 3rd (2012)
 World Morning Cup 50-54 age Mix-Doubles Champion, Double 3rd (2013)
 WCBF 20th Anniversary Individual Events 50-54 age Mix-Doubles Champion, Doubles 3rd (2013)
 Award Medal (AM) as a Member of the Order of Australia (2021)

Achievements

IBF International (11 titles, 2 runner-up)
Women's singles

Women's doubles

Mixed doubles

References

External links 
 
 

1962 births
Living people
Members of the Order of Australia
Australian female badminton players
Badminton players at the 1992 Summer Olympics
Olympic badminton players of Australia
Badminton coaches